National Democratic Party (NDP) was a political party in Kerala, India that existed from 1974 to 1996 and was the political arm of Nair Service Society. NDP was formed with the aim of reservation of jobs for the economically backward sections of the Nairs. Founded by Kidangoor Gopalakrishna Pillai (General Secretary of NSS), K. P. Ramachandran Nair, Kalathil Velayudhan Nair and Aranmula Kesavan Nair in 1974.

In assembly elections
National Democratic Party contested its first assembly elections in 1977 and won five assembly seats. Chathannoor Thankappan Pillai (Chengannur), N Bhaskaran Nair (Mavelikara), M P Narayanan Nair (Thiruvananthapuram East), R Sundareshan Nair (Neyyattinkara), Vattiyoorkavu Ravi (Thiruvananthapuram West) are the winners.

National Democratic Party contested in 1982 as an ally of Indian National Congress led United Democratic Front, in which it won four assembly seats. The elected members include Therambil Ramakrishnan (Thrissur), K.G.R. Kartha (Thrippunithara), K.R. Saraswathi Amma (Chengannur) and K. P. Ramachandran Nair (Alappuzha).

In the Third K. Karunakaran ministry as the nominee of Nair Service Society, K.G.R. Kartha sworn in as minister, but he was forced to step down. After Kartha's resign, in September 1983, R. Sundaresan Nair sworn in as the minister of state for health. After R. Sundaresan Nair's resignation, K. P. Ramachandran Nair took over as the minister for health.

Dissolution
NDP last contested an election in 1991. The party, which contested 3 seats in the udf front, won 2 seats. However, NDP left the UDF front in 1995 to protest against the desecration of the Mannam Samadhi Mandapam during Prime Minister Narasimha Rao's visit to Kerala. NSS dissolved the party in 1996.

List of Presidents
 Kidangoor Gopalakrishna Pillai
 Therambil Ramakrishnan
 Upendranath Kurup
 P. K. Narayana Panicker

References

Political parties established in 1974
1974 establishments in Kerala
Defunct political parties in Kerala
Political parties disestablished in 1996
1996 disestablishments in India
Nair